Izadi (lit. "yazidi") is an Iranian surname which can also be found in the Iranian diaspora. Notable people with the surname include:

 Mehdi Izadi (born 1998), Iranian football forward 
 Morteza Izadi Zardalou (born 1981), Iranian footballer
 Mostafa Izadi, Iranian senior military officer in the Revolutionary Guards with the rank of Major general

References 

Ethnonymic surnames
Persian-language surnames